Thomas Humes may refer to:

 Thomas J. Humes (1849–1904), mayor of Seattle
 Thomas William Humes (1815–1892), American clergyman and educator